Bidorpitia paracolumna is a species of moth of the family Tortricidae. It is found in Tungurahua Province, Ecuador.

The wingspan is about 23 mm. The ground colour of the forewings is ferruginous cream with rust-brown suffusions along the costa. The markings are rust brown. The hindwings are cream, mixed with orange in the apical third.

Etymology
The species name refers to the similarity with Bidorpitia columna plus the Latin prefix para (meaning near).

References

Moths described in 2008
Euliini
Moths of South America
Taxa named by Józef Razowski